Pictures – 40 Years of Hits is a compilation album by the British rock band Status Quo, and was released on 10 November 2008. The album was available as a standard double CD, a double CD + DVD "deluxe edition", and the four-CD "earBOOK" boxset, containing the single versions of all 76 Status Quo singles (including five singles in collaboration with other acts) from 1968 to 2008 inclusive, housed in a box that included a 120-page booklet and reproduction prints of fifty versions of Status Quo single and album covers recreated by famous musicians and celebrities. The original artwork was later auctioned off to raise money for the Prince's Trust, a charity Status Quo has long supported.

Track listing

Disc 1
 "Pictures of Matchstick Men" – 3:09
 "Ice in the Sun" – 2:10
 "Down the Dustpipe" – 2:02
 "In My Chair" – 3:13
 "Paper Plane" – 2:58
 "Mean Girl" – 3:36
 "Caroline" – 3:47
 "Break the Rules" – 3:38
 "Down Down" – 3:51
 "Roll Over Lay Down" (live) – 5:41
 "Rain" – 4:34
 "Mystery Song" – 3:59
 "Wild Side of Life" – 3:16
 "Rockin' All Over the World" – 3:34
 "Again and Again" – 3:40
 "Whatever You Want" – 3:48
 "Living on an Island" – 3:48
 "What You're Proposing" – 3:52
 "Lies" – 3:54
 "Don't Drive My Car" – 4:13

Disc 2
 "Something 'Bout You Baby I Like" – 2:39
 "Rock 'n' Roll" – 3:50
 "Dear John" – 3:11
 "Ol' Rag Blues" – 2:46
 "A Mess of Blues" – 3:20
 "Marguerita Time" – 3:20
 "The Wanderer" – 3:21
 "Rollin' Home" – 3:58
 "Red Sky" – 4:10
 "In the Army Now" – 3:40
 "Ain't Complaining" – 3:58
 "Burning Bridges (On and Off and On Again)" – 3:51
 "The Anniversary Waltz – Part One" – 5:32
 "I Didn't Mean It" – 3:22
 "Fun, Fun, Fun" (with The Beach Boys) – 3:03
 "Jam Side Down" – 3:28
 "You'll Come 'Round" – 3:24
 "The Party Ain't Over Yet" – 3:51
 "Beginning of the End" – 3:17
 "It's Christmas Time" – 4:11

 On the Australian and New Zealand releases, "Ol' Rag Blues" was omitted and the track "Jump That Rock (Whatever You Want)" by Scooter vs. Status Quo was included at the end of disc 2 instead.

Deluxe edition
Discs 1 and 2 as standard edition.

DVD track listing
 Interview with Francis Rossi – 28:04
 Interview with Rick Parfitt – 24:10
 "Running All Over the World" – 3:35
 "Can't Give You More" – 3:43
 "Rock 'Til You Drop"
 "Sherri Don't Fail Me Now" – 2:50
 "Restless"  – 4:10
 "I Didn't Mean It" – 3:24
 "The Way It Goes" – 3:18
 "Jam Side Down" – 3:31
 "You'll Come 'Round" – 3:22
 "Thinking of You" – 3:37
 "The Party Ain't Over Yet" – 4:21
 "Beginning of the End" – 3:19
 "Jump That Rock (Whatever You Want)" – 3:25

4-CD "earBOOK" track listing

Disc 1

Disc 2

Disc 3

Disc 4

Charts

Weekly charts

Year-end charts

Certifications

References

2008 compilation albums
Status Quo (band) compilation albums
Universal Records compilation albums